South Andaman district is one of the 3 districts of the Indian Union Territory of Andaman and Nicobar Islands located in the Bay of Bengal. Port Blair town, the capital of the Union Territory is the district headquarters. The area covered by this district is 2,640 km².

History
This district was created on August 18, 2006, by bifurcating the erstwhile Andaman district.

Geography

Demographics
According to the 2011 census South Andaman district has a population of 238,142, roughly equal to the nation of Vanuatu. This gives it a ranking of 584th in India (out of a total of 640). Its population growth rate over the decade 2001-2011 was 13.97%. South Andaman has a sex ratio of 874 females for every 1000 males, and a literacy rate of 88.49%.

Four of the indigenous Andamanese peoples, namely, Onges, Jarawas, Great Andamanese and Sentinelese live in this district.

Language

As of 2011 census, Bengali is spoken as the first language by 21.07 per cent of the district's population followed by Tamil (20.70%), Hindi (18.40%), Telugu (17.66%), Malayalam (9.85%), Sadri (3.34%), Kurukh (3.07%), Nicobarese (1.67%) and others.

Religion

Hinduism is followed by majority of the people in South Andaman district. Christianity and Islam are followed by a considerable population.

Divisions
The district comprises 3 tehsils, Port Blair, Ferrargunj and Little Andaman.

See also
 Nicobar district
 North and Middle Andaman district

References

External links
South Andaman district official website

 
Districts of the Andaman and Nicobar Islands
2006 establishments in India